The Bölkow Bo 102 Helitrainer was an unusual ground-based helicopter training aid that was developed and built by Bölkow of Germany in the late-1950s.  Designed to be mounted on a swivelling captive rig the Bo 102 allowed trainee pilots to practise procedures such as engine starting, rotor engagement and manipulation of the flight controls. Many of the Bo 102's components, including the single-bladed fibre-glass main rotor were used in the company's next design, the Bo 103.

Aircraft on display
Preserved examples of the Bo 102 are on public display at the Hubschraubermuseum Bückeburg, the Helicopter Museum (Weston),Classic Rotors Helicopter Museum, Ramona, California and in Rota, Spain.

Specifications (Bo 102)

See also

References

External links
 
Airbus early history 1920–1990

Bo 102
Flight training
Monocopters
1950s German helicopters